Carson James Palmquist (born October 17, 2000) is an American professional baseball pitcher in the Colorado Rockies organization.

Amateur career
Palmquist attended Riverdale High School in Fort Myers, Florida. As a senior in 2019, he did not allow an earned run and struck out 106 batters over  innings. Although he was scouted by major league teams, he went unselected in the 2019 Major League Baseball draft and enrolled at the University of Miami to play college baseball.

As a freshman at Miami in 2020, Palmquist went 1-0 with a 2.31 ERA and 15 strikeouts over  innings before the season was cancelled due to the COVID-19 pandemic. As a redshirt freshman in 2021, Palmquist was named Miami's closer. He made 25 appearances in which he went 1-1 with a 2.22 ERA, 75 strikeouts, and 14 saves over  innings. His 14 saves were third best in college baseball. He was named to the USA Baseball National Collegiate Team after the season. For the 2022 season, Palmquist moved into the starting rotation. Over 16 starts, he went 9-4 with a 3.54 ERA and 118 strikeouts over 84 innings. Following the season's end, he traveled to San Diego where he participated in the Draft Combine.

Professional career
Palmquist was drafted by the Colorado Rockies in the third round with the 88th overall selection of the 2022 Major League Baseball draft. He signed with the team for $775,000. He made his professional debut with the Rookie-level Arizona Complex League Rockies, pitching a total of one inning for the season.

References

External links
Miami Hurricanes bio

2000 births
Living people
Sportspeople from Fort Myers, Florida
Baseball players from Florida
Baseball pitchers
Miami Hurricanes baseball players
United States national baseball team players
Arizona Complex League Rockies players